Herbert Munday (23 April 18761961) was an English footballer who played in the Football League for Chesterfield Town.

References

1876 births
1961 deaths
English footballers
Association football forwards
English Football League players
Chesterfield F.C. players